The Monumbo or Bogia Bay languages are a pair of closely related languages that constitute a branch of the Torricelli language family. They are spoken in a few coastal villages around Bogia Bay of Bogia District, Madang Province in Papua New Guinea. Unlike all other Torricelli branches except for the Marienberg languages, word order in the Bogia languages is SOV, likely due to contact with Lower Sepik-Ramu and Sepik languages.

There are two languages,
Monumbo (Mambuwan) and Lilau

Classification
They have for several decades been lumped into the Torricelli family 100 km to the west, but "no evidence [for this] was ever presented" according to Glottolog. Foley (2018) classifies the Monumbo languages as Torricelli.

References

 
Sepik Coast languages
Languages of Madang Province